Angelique Ashby is an American politician and a member of the California State Senate. A Democrat, she represents the 8th State Senate District.

References

External links 
 Official website
 Angelique Ashby at Ballotpedia
 Campaign Website

Living people
Democratic Party California state senators
21st-century American women politicians
University of California, Davis alumni
McGeorge School of Law alumni
21st-century American politicians
Year of birth missing (living people)